Elections for the Local Government Council were held in Nauru on 10 December 1955.

Background
Since the first elections in 1951, the Local Government Council had gained more powers as in 1954 it had been given full access to the Nauru Royalty Trust Fund in order to pay for education.

Electoral system
The fourteen districts of Nauru were grouped into eight constituencies. Seven constituencies elected one member, whilst one elected two. The election was held under universal suffrage and any eligible voter could stand as a candidate. A total of 39 candidates stood in the election, an increase from 21 in the first elections.

Results
Of the 832 registered voters, 803 cast votes of which 14 were invalid. Only three of the nine members were re-elected.

Aftermath
Hammer DeRoburt was elected in the Boe constituency and was elected Head Chief by the council.

References

Nauru
1955 in Nauru
Elections in Nauru
December 1955 events in Oceania